The Shadow Theatre is an Edmonton-based theatre company born of the Edmonton International Fringe Festival in 1990.

History
Shadow Theatre was incorporated in 1992, operating under the governance of a volunteer Board of Directors. Co founded by Heartland star Shaun Johnston and current Artistic Director John Hudson. The two main people that created and maintain the theater are John Hudson (Artistic Director), Coralie Cairns (actor). The company is housed in the Varscona Theatre (200 seats) in the heart of Old Strathcona. The theatre has produced a regular main stage season since 1995, typically offering modern classics, innovative contemporary plays from around the world, and new Canadian works.

LEGAL MANDATE
To contribute to Canadian theatre arts by creating, developing and promoting theatrical works and artists in Northern Alberta including the development of new scripts and innovative approaches to existing works that are entertaining, provocative and accessible to wide audience.

VISION STATEMENT SHADOW THEATRE
To produce contemporary theatre from around the world for an adult audience which inspire and entertain and where story is paramount.  

Our passion is to present plays which pierce the complexities of the human experience. A Shadow Theatre production hits our audience’s hearts while simultaneously opening their minds.

CONTEXT
Shadow Theatre champions the work of Canadian and Edmonton playwrights, while simultaneously presenting Edmonton audiences the finest contemporary theatre from Canada and around the world. We are known as a company that respects story and text and where “the play’s the thing”. 

When choosing plays for our seasons there are several factors which we consider; first and foremost is our commitment to our audience. We have to make choices that will ultimately be insightful and entertaining. But in partnership with that commitment we know as artists we must take risks and try to find plays which intrigue us, and will expand our skills as theatre practitioners. 

We feel it is essential that Shadow Theatre participate in the broader Canadian theatre community through its commitment to Canadian plays. With our new play development program we are at the forefront of companies creating and producing new Canadian plays in Edmonton. As well, second and third productions of the work of our nation’s finest playwrights is crucial to the lasting success of those plays, and so Shadow is determined to provide those vital productions.

References

External links 
 Official Site: Shadow Theatre

Theatres in Edmonton